Francis "Faceboy" Hall is an actor, producer, and activist working in the New York City arts community. Hall, the younger brother of poet and King Missile frontman, John S. Hall, is one of the founding members of the Art Stars. Hall has appeared in numerous stage productions and several films, including Robert Downey Sr.'s Too Much Sun and the television series 'Electra Elf'. In addition, Hall was a founding member of the Dance Liberation Front where he has worked to overturn New York City's "no dancing" cabaret laws. A poet and performer himself, Faceboy is best known as the host of the weekly Faceboyz Open Mic, which is now considered to be the longest continually running open mic in New York. He hosted 'Faceboyz Folliez', a monthly show that took place at the Bowery Poetry Club.

Career
'Faceboyz Open Mic' was an open mike show held Sundays at Surf Reality on the Lower East Side, which was described as "one of the city’s most nurturing, freak-friendly weekly happenings."

Regarding Faceboy's performances, The New York Times wrote:
"Faceboy himself did a dramatic reading of personal ads taken from
a pornographic magazine. It was, like much of that evening's six hours, unprintable. And very funny."

Ten years later in a full page article in Time Out New York he was described as a performer who, "has persevered through the neighborhood’s gentrification with an almost religious devotion to the art of the open mike."

Films and Television
Hall's film career began In 1990, when he appeared in Robert Downey Sr.'s Too Much Sun alongside childhood friend Robert Downey Jr. In 1998 he played himself in the film When, and in 2003, he played the lead role in a short film titled Nights Like These. Faceboy starred as 'Scroto Baggins' in the short film 'Lord of the Cockrings' directed by Nick Zedd

As well as appearing in the music video 'New York, New York' by Moby, Faceboy also starred in the television series  'Electra Elf' created by Rev. Jen Miller and Nick Zedd.

Media coverage
Faceboy's work has been included in "Best of" lists, referenced, and written up in several publications, including:

Best ofs and awards
The Village Voice Best of New York: 2001  and 2005 
New York Press Best of Manhattan 1997 and 2003

Write ups
Downtown Express newspaper, "Collective: Unconscious regroups in Tribeca theater Anchor shows “Reverend Jen’s Anti-Slam” on Wednesday nights and “Faceboyz Open Mike” on Sunday nights made an easy transition to Tribeca,"

References
NY Daily News Interviewed for his opinions on the film "Burlesque" starring Cher. Identified as a 15-year veteran of New York City's "Neo-Burlesque" scene  Two photos of Faceboy were included in the article 
The Village Voice Interview with Jonathan Ames  "Ames has realized that Moby and another odd buddy, the performer Faceboy, have similar birth names: Richard Hall  and Francis Richard Hall, respectively. Ames can't contain his amusement that the two have met without discovering this."
Esquire Interview with Robert Downey Jr.  "my buddy Frank Hall — who I've known since I was five"
NY Daily News lifestyle  "Things are different at Faceboyz Open Mike, where comics and performance artists get 8 minutes in front of one of the most appreciative audiences in the city. Comics Jeffrey Ross and Jim Gaffigan, and performance artists like Jen Miller and Michael (Soy Bomb) Portnoy are all veterans of this stage."
Time Out New York and The Village Voice Faceboy has officiated the Q&A segment of the Annual Mr. Lower East Side pageant. 
Time Out New York At the launch party "Downtown stalwart Reverend Jen reads from her new book, Live Nude Elf, about her life as a sex columnist for Nerve. Special guests include open-mike devotee Faceboy, who will read an essay, and Janeane Garofolo, who will perform stand-up"

External links
 
 List of appearances on Keith and the Girl

References

Record producers from New York (state)
Male actors from New York City
Living people
Year of birth missing (living people)
Performance art in New York City
American male poets
Activists from New York City